Southport is an unincorporated community in Washington Township, Owen County, in the U.S. state of Indiana.

Geography

References

Unincorporated communities in Owen County, Indiana
Unincorporated communities in Indiana